Hugh Mercer Apothecary was a pharmacy founded by Hugh Mercer in the mid-18th century. Mercer was a doctor who fled Scotland after the Battle of Culloden. He travelled to Pennsylvania, where he met Colonel George Washington during the French and Indian War and later moved to Fredericksburg, Virginia, on Washington's advice to practice medicine and operate an apothecary.

The building that housed the apothecary has been restored by Preservation Virginia (formerly known as the Association for the Preservation of Virginia Antiquities) to demonstrate 18th Century medical treatments. It also includes a small exhibit on Mercer's life and contributions to the American Revolutionary War.

In mid-2012, Preservation Virginia signed an agreement passing ownership to the "Washington Heritage Museums" group beginning in 2013.

The museum is located at 1020 Caroline Street in Fredericksburg, Virginia.

Sources

External links
Washington Heritage Museums
Preservation Virginia: Hugh Mercer Apothecary

Defunct pharmacies of the United States
Museums in Fredericksburg, Virginia
Medical museums in the United States
History museums in Virginia
Pharmacy museums
Historic district contributing properties in Virginia
National Register of Historic Places in Fredericksburg, Virginia
Health care companies based in Virginia
Pharmacies on the National Register of Historic Places